Zhang Yanqing may refer to:
 Zhang Yanqing (softball)
 Zhang Yanqing (politician)